The Rayleigh's quotient represents a quick method to estimate the natural frequency of a multi-degree-of-freedom vibration system, in which the mass and the stiffness matrices are known.

The eigenvalue problem for a general system of the form

in absence of damping and external forces reduces to

The previous equation can be written also as the following:

where , in which  represents the natural frequency, M and K are the real positive symmetric mass and stiffness matrices respectively.

For an n-degree-of-freedom system the equation has n solutions ,  that satisfy the equation

In the previous equation it is also possible to observe that the numerator is proportional to the potential energy while the denominator depicts a measure of the kinetic energy. Moreover, the equation allow us to calculate the natural frequency only if the eigenvector (as well as any other displacement vector)  is known. By doing so we obtain the scalar , also known as Rayleigh's quotient:

Therefore, the Rayleigh's quotient is a scalar whose value depends on the vector  and it can be calculated with good approximation for any arbitrary vector  as long as it lays reasonably far from the modal vectors , i = 1,2,3,...,n.

Since, it is possible to state that the vector  differs from the modal vector  by a small quantity of first order, the correct result of the Rayleigh's quotient will differ not sensitively from the estimated one and that's what makes this method very useful. A good way to estimate the lowest modal vector , that generally works well for most structures (even though is not guaranteed), is to assume  equal to the static displacement from an applied force that has the same relative distribution of the diagonal mass matrix terms. The latter can be elucidated by the following 3-DOF example.

Example – 3DOF 

As an example, we can consider a 3-degree-of-freedom system in which the mass and the stiffness matrices of them are known as follows:

To get an estimation of the lowest natural frequency we choose a trial vector of static displacement obtained by loading the system with a force proportional to the masses:

Thus, the trial vector will become

that allow us to calculate the Rayleigh's quotient:

Thus, the lowest natural frequency, calculated by means of Rayleigh's quotient is:

Using a calculation tool is pretty fast to verify how much it differs from the "real" one. In this case, using MATLAB, it has been calculated that the lowest natural frequency is:  that has led to an error of  using the Rayleigh's approximation, that is a remarkable result.

The example shows how the Rayleigh's quotient is capable of getting an accurate estimation of the lowest natural frequency. The practice of using the static displacement vector as a trial vector is valid as the static displacement vector tends to resemble the lowest vibration mode.

References

Abstract algebra
Linear algebra
Mathematical physics
Mechanical vibrations